The West Coast Eagles are an Australian rules football team based in Perth, Western Australia. The 2022 AFL Women's season, which started in January 2021, is their third season in the competition. At the end of the 2021 season, West Coast delisted 10 players, gained a player via trade, a player via restricted free agency and five players at the 2021 AFL Women's draft. 2021 coach Daniel Pratt was replaced with Michael Prior, after Pratt resigned from the role.

Background
The West Coast Eagles are an Australian rules football team based in Perth, Western Australia, that competes in the AFL Women's (AFLW). In the 2021 AFL Women's season, they finished the season with two wins and seven losses, placing them 12th on the ladder out of 14 teams, and thus missing out on playing in the 2021 finals series.

In September 2021, it was announced that Michael Prior would take over as head coach from Daniel Pratt, as Pratt's partner was scheduled to give birth early 2022, and they didn't want him to do any quarantine that could occur in the AFLW.

Emma Swanson was captain for a third season, and Dana Hooker was vice-captain for a third season. Parris Laurie was part of the leadership group for a second season, joined by Aisling McCarthy, who joined the leadership group for the first time. These positions were decided by a vote between the players.

Playing list

Changes
During the off-season, Mhicca Carter, Beatrice Devlyn, McKenzie Dowrick, Brianna Green, Alicia Janz, Demi Liddle, Julie-Anne Norrish, Kate Orme, Chantella Perera and Katelyn Pope were delisted.

In May 2021, the AFL commission approved giving five AFLW clubs, including West Coast, various assistance measures to help strengthen their playing list. West Coast received priority draft picks in the second and third rounds of the 2021 draft, directly after the fifth selection in those rounds. The priority picks were given under the condition that West Coast's first five draft picks were not traded to another club. The Eagles received Fremantle player Evangeline Gooch in exchange for draft pick 38.

In the 2021 AFL Women's draft, teams were only allowed to pick from a pool of players in their state. West Coast held the first three out of four draft picks in Western Australia, with Fremantle holding the second in the state. West Coast ended up drafting Charlie Thomas (pick 3), Courtney Rowley (pick 21), Beth Schilling (pick 24), Sarah Lakay (pick 40) and Emily Bennett (pick 47).

Statistics

Season summary
The 2022 AFL Women's season started in January 2021, ended in March 2022, and had 10 rounds.

Results

Ladder

References

West Coast Eagles seasons
West Coast
West Coast